Dominik Nerz (born 25 August 1989) is a German former professional road cyclist, who competed professionally between 2010 and 2016 for the , ,  and  teams. A junior national champion on the track, Nerz primarily competed on the road.

Career
After numerous wins at the junior level, he joined 's development setup and won the German under-23 national road race title. After a single season for Milram's continental team, he joined the senior squad and turned professional.

After Milram's disbandment, he joined  for 2011, and rode his first Grand Tour later that year – the 2011 Vuelta a España. Riding in support of Vincenzo Nibali, he finished 38th overall and was the highest ranked German in the general classification. He also finished third on stage 19, for his best result of the season.

In September 2014,  announced that they had signed Nerz on a two-year deal from 2015, as a team leader for the Grand Tours and similar stage races.

In October 2016, Nerz confirmed his retirement from competition due to health reasons.

Major results

2006
 1st  Team pursuit, National Junior Track Championships
2007
 1st Overall Giro della Toscana Juniors
1st Mountains classification
1st Stage 1
 2nd Time trial, National Junior Road Championships
 2nd Overall Trofeo Karlsberg
1st Mountains classification
1st Stage 3a (ITT)
2008
 3rd GP Hydraulika Mikolasek
 7th Overall Tour de Berlin
 7th Tour de Berne
2009
 1st  Road race, National Under-23 Road Championships
 1st Stage 6 Giro della Valle d'Aosta
 7th Overall Giro del Friuli-Venezia Giulia
2010
 8th Grand Prix of Aargau Canton
2012
 2nd Eschborn–Frankfurt City Loop
 5th GP Miguel Induráin
 6th Overall Tour of Slovenia
2014
 9th Overall Tour de Pologne
2015
 1st Stage 1 (TTT) Giro del Trentino
2016
 7th Overall Critérium International

Grand Tour general classification results timeline

References

External links

Dominik Nerz profile at 

1989 births
Living people
German male cyclists
People from Wangen im Allgäu
Sportspeople from Tübingen (region)
Cyclists from Baden-Württemberg
21st-century German people